The 2009 Estoril Open was a tennis tournament played on outdoor clay courts. It was the 20th edition of the Estoril Open for the men (the 13th for the women), and was part of the ATP World Tour 250 series of the 2009 ATP World Tour, and of the International-level tournaments of the 2009 WTA Tour. Both the men's and the women's events took place at the Estádio Nacional in Oeiras, Portugal, from 2 May through 10 May 2009.

The men's draw was headlined by Gilles Simon, former 2002 and 2006 champion David Nalbandian and 2003 champion Nikolay Davydenko. Other players included David Ferrer, Mardy Fish and 2001 champion Juan Carlos Ferrero.

The women's draw was headlined by 2004 and 2008 finalist Iveta Benešová and 2008 champion Maria Kirilenko. Other players included Shahar Pe'er and Anna-Lena Grönefeld.

ATP entrants

Seeds

 Seedings are based on the rankings of April 27, 2009.

Other entrants
The following players received wildcards into the main draw:
  Gilles Simon
  Gastón Gaudio
  Rui Machado

The following players received entry from the qualifying draw:
  Pablo Cuevas
  Mikhail Kukushkin
  Ricardo Hocevar
  Ryan Sweeting

WTA entrants

Seeds

 Seedings are based on the rankings of April 27, 2009.

Other entrants
The following players received wildcards into the main draw:
  Neuza Silva
  Frederica Piedade
  Maria João Koehler

The following players received entry from the qualifying draw:
  Eva Fernández Brugués
  Sharon Fichman
  Silvia Soler Espinosa
  Elena Bovina

Finals

Men's singles

 Albert Montañés defeated  James Blake, 5–7, 7–6(8–6), 6–0
 It was Montañés' first title of the year and second of his career.

Women's singles

 Yanina Wickmayer defeated  Ekaterina Makarova, 7–5, 6–2
 It was Wickmayer's first career title.

Men's doubles

 Eric Butorac /  Scott Lipsky defeated  Martin Damm /  Robert Lindstedt, 6–3, 6–2

Women's doubles

 Raquel Kops-Jones /  Abigail Spears defeated  Sharon Fichman /  Katalin Marosi, 2–6, 6–3, [10–5]

External links

 Official website

Portugal Open
Estoril
Estoril
Estoril Open
 Estoril Open